Futuristic Polar Bears is a British DJ and producer from London.

Fran Cosgrave has been signed to labels Spinnin', Revealed Smash The House and Protocol recordings.

Career
The Futuristic Polar Bear has had many hit singles, including various number 1 singles in the Beatport Global dance charts, with releases on Revealed Recordings and their own record label CMMD Records

Originally, FPB was a trio, but Luke Hayes left in August 2018.

Discography

Singles

Charted singles

Other singles
 2013: Drift (with East & Young) [Strictly Rhythm]
 2013: Never Give Up [Pacha Recordings]
 2013: All Night Long [Klass Action]
 2014: Back To Earth [Revealed Recordings]
 2014: Tomorrow Is Now (with Mark Le Sal) [Mutants]
 2014: Game Over [Harem Records]
 2014: Vargo (with Danny Howard) [Spinnin' Records]
 2014: Romani (with Danny Howard) [Spinnin' Records]
 2014: Taurus (with Thomas Newson) [Revealed Recordings]
 2015: The Ride [Starter Records]
 2015: Manila (with Sultan + Shepard) [Harem Records]
 2015: Velocity (with Henry Fong) [Revealed Recordings]
 2015: Night Vision [Armada Trice]
 2015: Shake It Off (with Kill The Buzz) [Revealed Recordings]
 2015: BYOS (with Sandro Silva) [Armada Music]
 2015: Why (with D.O.D) [Wall Recordings]
 2016: Cupid's Casualty (with Mark Sixma and Amba Sheperd) [Armada Music]
 2016: Lynx (with Maddix) [Revealed Recordings]
 2016: Sea Coffee (With Mattn and Dimitri Vegas & Like Mike) [Blanco y Negro]
 2016: Kali (with Qulinez) [Armada Music]
 2017: Grizzly (with Dimitri Vangelis & Wyman) [Buce Records]
 2017: Cactus (with Wolfpack featuring X-Tof) [Smash The House]
 2017: Destiny (with Wolfpack featuring Shurakano) [Smash The House]
 2018: Are Am Eye (with KEVU) [Smash The House]
 2018: Can't Get Over You (featuring Syon) [Moon Records]
 2018: Running Wild (with Yves V featuring PollyAnna) [Spinnin' Records]
 2018: Derb (with Wolfpack) [Smash The House]
 2018: Moksha (with Wolfpack) [Cmmd Records]
 2018: Throne (with Mattn and Olly James) [Smash The House]
 2018: Aventus [Maxximize]
 2018: I Can't Do It (with Kess Ross) [Protocol Recordings]
 2018: Acid Drop (with Dimitri Vangelis & Wyman) [Buce Records]
 2019 Favourite DJ (with Kess Ross) [Sirup Music]
 2019: Scars (with Vanto and DJ Junior) [Cmmd Records]
 2019: Cntrl (with DJ Junior, Mylok and Love Letters)
 2019: You & Me [Protocol Recordings]
 2019: Madness (with MR. BLACK) [Revealed Music]
 2019: Odyssey (with ANGEMI) [Maxximize]
 2019: Shiva (with DJ Yaksa, Bustarow and Love Letters) [23rd Precinct]
2018: Gypsy (with Mariana BO and MR. BLACK) [Dharma]
 2020: After Party (with Lenerd featuring Love Letters) [Cmmd Records]
 2020: Better Than This (featuring Franky) [Protocol Recordings]
 2020: Take Control [Protocol Recordings]
 2020: Nebula (with REGGIO and Love Letters) [Cmmd Records]
 2020: Faith (featuring Lux) [Protocol Recordings]
 2020: With Your Love (with Jaxx & Vega) [Revealed Music]
 2020: Horns Of Fire (featuring Jesus Davila) [Cmmd Records]
 2020: Rave Anthem (with REGGIO) [Revealed]
 2020: Run Away (with Bassjackers and Jaxx & Vega) [Smash The House]
 2020: Lord of the Rave (with Wolfpack and Nick Havsen) [Generation Smash]
 2021: Aura (with Corey James featuring MØØNE) [Protocol Recordings]
 2021: United We Stand (with Justin Prime) [Cmmd Records]
 2021: Addiction (with Cuebrick and Angie Vu Ha featuring Iives) [Maxximize]
 2021: Mind Reader (with Sammy Boyle) [Cmmd Records]
 2021: Ravers Unite (with Brian Cross) [Generation Smash]
 2021: No Tears Allowed (featuring Franky) [Protocol Recordings]
 2021: Take Me Away (with Jewelz & Sparks featuring Carly Lyn) [Maxximize]
 2021: Breathless (with Tony Junior and Skazi) [Revealed]
 2021: Kiss The Night (with Justin Prime and K1lo) [Nexchapter]
 2021: Witchcraft (with Mastercraft UK featuring Jaimes) [Purple Fly Records]
 2022: The One (with Havoq featuring Diandra Faye) [Revealed]

Remixes
 2014: Divine Inspiration - "The Way (Put Your Hand In My Hand)" (Futuristic Polar Bears Remix) [Heat Recordings]
 2014: Idyll - "Paradisal" (Futuristic Polar Bears Remix) [Anticodon]
 2015: Marletron - "World Is Yours" (Futuristic Polar Bears Remix) [Monster Tunes]
 2016: Kreesha Turner, Sultan & Ned Shepard - "Bring Me Back" (Futuristic Polar Bears Remix) [Armada Music]
 2017: Jurgen Vries - "The Theme" (Futuristic Polar Bears Remix) [Armada Music]
 2017: MATTN and Magic Wand featuring Neisha Neshae - "Let The Song Play" (Futuristic Polar Bears Remix) [Smash The House]
 2017: Morgan Page and Damon Sharpe featuring Stella Rio  - "Beautiful Disaster" (Futuristic Polar Bears Remix) [Armada Music]
 2018: Dimitri Vegas & Like Mike and Steve Aoki vs. Ummet Ozcan - "Melody" (Futuristic Polar Bears Remix) [Free Download]
2018: Dimitri Vegas & Like Mike featuring Wolfpack - "Ocarina" (Futuristic Polar Bears Remix) [Free Download]
2018: Dimitri Vegas, Moguai & Like Mike - "Mammoth" (Futuristic Polar Bears Remix) [Free Download]
2018: Regi - "Ellie" (Futuristic Polar Bears Remix) [CNR Music Belgium]
2020: Qulinez - "El Toro" (Futuristic Polar Bears Remix) [TurnItUp Muzik]
2020: Jerry Davila ft. Richie Loop - Celebrate (Futuristic Polar Bears, Jerry Davila & DJ Pelos Remix)
2020: Krewella featuring Asim Azhar - "Paradise" (Futuristic Polar Bears Remix) [Mixed Kids Records]
2021: MR. BLACK ft. Richie Loop - "Feel The Fire" (Futuristic Polar Bears and Jerry Davila Remix) [Skink]
2021: Yves V - Echo (Futuristic Polar Bears Remix) [Controversia]

References

Notes
 A  Did not enter the Ultratop 50, but peaked on the Dance Bubbling Under chart.
 B  Did not enter the Ultratop 50, but peaked on the Walloon Ultratip chart.

Sources

External links
Official website

English DJs
English record producers
English house musicians
English electronic musicians
Electro house musicians
Spinnin' Records artists
Electronic dance music DJs